The Southern Conference Hall of Fame, located in Spartanburg, South Carolina, USA, is a hall of fame devoted to former Southern Conference student-athletes, coaches, and administrators. The Hall of Fame, with an inaugural class of 10, was established in 2009. The second class for 2010 included seven former conference greats.

Criteria for induction
Athletes who competed for a minimum of two seasons along with coaches and administrators who spent at least five years in the conference were eligible for consideration. A total of 254 candidates from former and current conference institutions were eligible for induction into the first class.

Members
As of 2022, the Hall of Fame has 54 members.

References

External links
 Southern Conference official website

Hall
>
Halls of fame in South Carolina
Buildings and structures in Spartanburg, South Carolina
Awards established in 2009
2009 establishments in South Carolina